Washington County School District is a school district headquartered in St. George, Utah, United States, with 34,771 students enrolled as of January 2021.  The district serves students in Washington County.

The Washington County School District administrative office building, located at 121 West Tabernacle, St. George, was constructed in a style to fit in with the surrounding historic sandstone buildings.

The district provides public education for students in kindergarten through twelfth grade in Washington County cities and towns, including St. George, Bloomington, Bloomington Hills, Winchester Hills, Dammeron Valley, Washington, Santa Clara, Ivins, Hurricane, La Verkin, Central, Veyo, Pine Valley, Leeds, Hildale, Springdale, and Toquerville, covering an area of over 2,400 square miles (over 6,200 square kilometers).

The district also provides special education services for adults through Post High School.

History

Washington County School District was formed in June 1915 by the consolidation of nineteen separate school districts.

Mission statement

Superintendents

Board of Education
Laura Hesson, President
Debbra Zockoll, Vice President
LaRene Cox
Kelly Blake
Craig Seegmiller
David Stirland
Barbara Beckstrom

Schools

High schools
In WCSD all high schools are grades 10-12 with the exception of Enterprise and Water Canyon, which both operate 7-12

Crimson Cliffs High School, Washington, Utah

Desert Hills High School, St. George
Dixie High School, St. George
Enterprise High School (Utah), Enterprise
Hurricane High School, Hurricane
Millcreek High School, St. George
Pine View High School, St. George
Snow Canyon High School, St. George
Utah Online School, St. George
Water Canyon High School, Hildale

Middle schools
In WCSD all middle schools are grades 8-9, with Enterprise and Water Canyon students within their respective high school.

Crimson Cliffs Middle School, Washington
Dixie Middle School, St. George
Hurricane Middle School, Hurricane
Pine View Middle School, St. George
Snow Canyon Middle School, St. George
Desert Hills Middle School, St. George
Utah Online School, St. George

Intermediate schools
In WCSD all intermediate schools are grades 6-7, while at Enterprise and Water Canyon 7th grade attend the high school, and 6th grade attend the respective elementary.

Fossil Ridge Intermediate School, St. George
Hurricane Intermediate School, Hurricane
Lava Ridge Intermediate School, Santa Clara
Sunrise Ridge Intermediate School, St. George
Tonaquint Intermediate School, St. George
Utah Online School, St. George
Washington Fields Intermediate, Washington

Elementary schools
In WCSD all elementary schools are grades PK-5, with Enterprise and Water Canyon elementary schools also including the 6th grade.

Arrowhead Elementary School, Santa Clara
Bloomington Elementary School, St. George
Bloomington Hills Elementary School, St. George
Coral Canyon Elementary, Washington
Coral Cliffs Elementary School, St. George
Crimson View Elementary School, St. George
Diamond Valley Elementary School, St. George
Enterprise Elementary School, Enterprise
Heritage Elementary School (formerly West Elementary), St. George
Horizon Elementary School, Washington
Hurricane Elementary School, Hurricane
LaVerkin Elementary School, La Verkin
Legacy Elementary School (formerly East Elementary), St. George
Little Valley Elementary School, St. George
Majestic Fields Elementary School, Washington
Panorama Elementary School, St. George
Paradise Canyon Elementary School (formerly Dixie Sun, Dixie Downs Elementary), St. George
Red Mountain Elementary School, Ivins
Riverside Elementary School, Washington
Sandstone Elementary School, St. George
Santa Clara Elementary School, Santa Clara
South Mesa Elementary School, St. George
Springdale Elementary School, Springdale
Sunset Elementary School, St. George
Three Falls Elementary School, Hurricane
Washington Elementary School, Washington
Water Canyon School, Hildale
Utah Online School, St. George

The district previously operated Phelps Elementary and Middle School, a K-8 school. In early 2000 it had over 400 pupils. In late 2000 its enrollment fell to 90 after fundamentalist Mormon groups withdrew their children. In fall 2001 its enrollment would have been below 12, so the district closed it and offered entities to lease it.

Clubs

Academic Decathlon
Animation Club
ASL Club
Ballroom Dance
Bowling Club: St. George High School Bowling Club
This is a multi high school club that serves students from Dixie, Pineview, Snow Canyon, and Desert Hills.
Debate
DECA
Drama Club
FBLA: Future Business Leaders of America
FCCLA: Family, Career and Community Leaders of America
FFA: Future Farmers of America
French Club
German Club
GSA: Gay-straight alliance
Three high schools in St. George operated by the school district have gay-straight alliance clubs founded in the autumn of 2010, The New York Times reported in January 2011, although the alliance organizers encountered hostility from some students.
GYC
HOSA: Health Occupations Students of America
Interact Club
Works with the local Rotary Club
International Club
Key Club
JROTC
Letterman's Club
National Honor Society
Pep Club
Ping Pong Club
Polynesian Club
RASK
Reading Club
Science Club
Science Olympiad
Speech & Debate Club
Skills USA
Spanish Club
Upward Bound

References

External links
 

School districts in Utah
Education in Washington County, Utah
1915 establishments in Utah
School districts established in 1915